Ahead of the Curve: Two Years at Harvard Business School (in the United Kingdom and elsewhere, the book is called "What They Teach You at Harvard Business School: My Two Years in the Cauldron of Capitalism") is a non-fiction book by author and journalist Philip Delves Broughton. It was published by Penguin Press in 2008. The book covers the author's two year experience at the Harvard Business School (HBS).

External links
 Book review, Business Week, 7-Aug-2008.
 Book review, The Economist, 7-Aug-2008.
 Book review, The New York Times, 16-Aug-2008.
 Book's website at www.philipdelvesbroughton.com.

References

2008 non-fiction books
Finance books
Penguin Press books